A. nana may refer to:
 Acanthiza nana, the Yellow Thornbill, a passerine bird species usually found in Australia
 Acourtia nana, the dwarf desertpeony, a plant species in the genus Acourtia found in the Sonoran Desert
 Amorpha nana, the dwarf indigo, dwarf indigobush, dwarf false indigo, fragrant indigo-bush, fragrant false indigo or dwarf wild indigo, a perennial shrub species native to North America
 Aratinga nana, the Olive-throated Parakeet, a bird species
 Aristolochia nana, the tiny pelican flower, a plant species in the genus Aristolochia

Synonyms
 Amygdalus nana, a synonym for Prunus tenella, the dwarf Russian almond, a deciduous tree species

Other uses
 Nana (surname), for people abbreviated as "A. Nana"

See also
 Nana (disambiguation)
 Anana (disambiguation)